Alhadas is a town in the municipality of Figueira da Foz, Portugal. The population in 2011 was 4,757, in an area of 31.84 km2.

References

Freguesias of Figueira da Foz